Frank Harris (born March 4, 1948 in Stoneham, Massachusetts) is a former American football quarterback.

Harris played for the Boston College Eagles football team. He finished his BC career first all time in passing yards (4,555), attempts (655), touchdowns (44), and interceptions (45). Although all of these records would be broken by Doug Flutie, Harris' 37 completions and 57 pass attempts against the Army Black Knights in 1968 are still BC records (Shawn Halloran and Matt Ryan have each tied the attempts record).

Harris was selected by the Detroit Lions in the 6th round (150th overall pick) in the 1971 NFL Draft. He was cut by the Lions at the end of the preseason.

After football, Harris went on to a business career, starting out in sales with a liquor company. When his employer wanted to transfer him to Alabama, he quit and returned to the Boston area, where he opened a sporting goods store. He later became the co-owner of an ecological services firm in that area.

References

1948 births
Living people
American football quarterbacks
Boston College Eagles football players
Detroit Lions players